The British pet massacre was an event in 1939 in the United Kingdom where over 750,000 pets were killed in preparation for food shortages during World War II.

Background

In 1939, the British government formed the National Air Raid Precautions Animals Committee (NARPAC) to decide what to do with pets before the war broke out. The committee was worried that when the government would need to ration food, owners would decide to split their rations with their pets or leave the animals to starve.  In response to that fear, NARPAC published a pamphlet titled "Advice to Animal Owners."  The pamphlet suggested moving pets from the big cities and into the countryside. It concluded with the statement that "If you cannot place them in the care of neighbours, it really is kindest to have them destroyed." The pamphlet also contained an advertisement for a captive bolt pistol that could be used to humanely kill the animals.

Incident
When war was declared in 1939, many pet owners flocked to pet surgery clinics and animal homes to kill their pets. Many veterinarian groups such as the PDSA and the RSPCA were against these drastic measures, but their hospitals were still flooded with pet owners in the first few days. PDSA founder Maria Dickin reported: "Our technical officers called upon to perform this unhappy duty will never forget the tragedy of those days."

When London was bombed in September 1940, even more pet owners rushed to kill their pets. "People were worried about the threat of bombing and food shortages and felt it inappropriate to have the 'luxury' of a pet during wartime".

Opposition
Battersea Dogs & Cats Home, against the trend, managed to feed and care for 145,000 dogs during the course of the war and provided a field in Ilford as a pet cemetery, "where about 500,000 animals were buried, many from the first week of the war". A famous opponent of pet culling was Nina Douglas-Hamilton, Duchess of Hamilton, a cat lover, who campaigned against the killing and created her own sanctuary in a heated hangar at Ferne.

Aftermath
Estimates say that over 750,000 pets were killed over the course of the event. Many pet owners, after getting over the fear of bombings and lack of food, regretted killing their pets and blamed the government for starting the hysteria.

In 2017, author Hilda Kean published a book, The Great Cat and Dog Massacre, telling the story from a historical perspective.

References

Sources
 
 

1939 in the United Kingdom
Animal cruelty incidents
Animal deaths by euthanasia
Pet massacre
Massacre
United Kingdom home front during World War II